The Dartmouth Big Green represented Dartmouth College in ECAC women's ice hockey during the 2016–17 NCAA Division I women's ice hockey season.

Offseason

August 22: Laura Stacey ('16) was drafted by the Brampton Thunder of the Canadian Women's Hockey League.  A

Recruiting

2016–17 Big Green

2016-17 Schedule

|-
!colspan=12 style="  style="background:#00693e; color:white;"| Regular Season

References

Dartmouth
Dartmouth Big Green women's ice hockey seasons